Ciprian Ștefan Milea (born 12 July 1984) is a Romanian footballer who plays as a midfielder for Știința Miroslava.

References

External links
 
 

1984 births
Living people
Sportspeople from Galați
Romanian footballers
Association football midfielders
Liga I players
Liga II players
FCM Dunărea Galați players
FC Politehnica Iași (1945) players
FC Petrolul Ploiești players
FC Politehnica Iași (2010) players
ASC Oțelul Galați players
FCV Farul Constanța players
CS Știința Miroslava players